The IdeaPad S Series is a series of notebook computers launched by Lenovo in October 2008. The IdeaPad S10 was initially scheduled for launch in September, but its release was delayed in the United States until October.

The S series began with the IdeaPad S10, the lowest cost model, powered by an Intel Atom processor in a 10.2-inch subnotebook. Later, more expensive laptops in the S-series also powered by Intel Atoms were released. Once the Atom CPU line was discontinued, the main line of lightweight S series laptops switched to alternatives, such as the low-power AMD A-series, Intel Celeron, Pentium, and low-cost versions of Y-series CPUs.

2008
The IdeaPad S10, the first laptop in the IdeaPad S Series of netbooks, was released in 2008.

S10 
The IdeaPad S10 was Lenovo's first netbook. While Engadget found the design unremarkable, the low starting price was well-received. The S10 featured a  TFT active matrix 1024×576 or 1024×600 display with an 80 or 160 GB hard disk drive and 512 MB or 1 GB DDR2 Random Access Memory, both of which could be upgraded via a trap door on the bottom of the netbook. The initial S10 featured 512 MB of RAM soldered to system board with an expansion SO-DIMM slot for further upgrades to 2 or 2.5 GB (2.5 GB was only usable with an operating system with support for sparse memory regions). The processor was an Intel Atom that ran at 1.6 GHz. The S10 supported IEEE 802.11 b/g wireless networking and had two USB ports, an ExpressCard expansion slot, a 4-in-1 media reader, and a VGA output. These computers received positive consumer reviews and a 9/10 rating from Wired magazine.

In May 2009 Lenovo introduced the S10-2. While the S10-2 shared many traits with the S10/S10e, it omitted the ExpressCard34 slot, featured a new physical design, added an additional USB port, and enlarged the keyboard, touchpad, and sizes of the hard drive and SSD.

2009
The IdeaPad S Series netbooks released by Lenovo in 2009 were the S10e, S10-2, and the S12.

S10e
The IdeaPad S10e was a re-launch of the IdeaPad S10, with features updated for the education market. The netbook included a quick start operating system and 5 hours of battery life at a low starting price. It weighed 2.8 lbs, with a form factor of 9.8 x 7.7 x 0.9–1.4-inches. The netbook offered a wide keyboard occupying almost the entire width of the chassis, and LAPTOP Magazine reported that it was easy for even adults to type on.

S10-2
The IdeaPad S10-2 was a 10-inch netbook with a 1.6 GHz Intel Atom processor, 1GB RAM, a 6-cell battery, and Intel GMA Integrated Graphics. Notebook Review reported that the netbook's design offered "a cleaner and smoother appearance all around". The specifications of the netbook are as follows:

Processor: Intel Atom N270 1.6 GHz or Intel Atom N280 1.66 GHz and Hyper-Threading 
RAM: 1GB DDR2 667 MHz
Display: 10.1" (WSVGA, Glossy, LED-backlit, 1024x600)
Storage: 160GB 5400rpm
Graphics: Intel GMA 950 Integrated
Wi-Fi: Broadcom 802.11b/g
Card reader: 4-in-1
Dimensions: 10.2 x 7.6 x 0.7-1.8 (inches)
Operating system: Windows XP Home Edition (SP3)

S12
 

The IdeaPad S12 received a fairly positive review from PCMagazine. Its features that were well-received included the 12 inch widescreen with a 1280 x 800 resolution, keyboard, express card slot, and battery life. However, the netbook's price and weight were poorly received by the reviewers. The specifications of the netbook are as follows:

Processor: Intel Atom N270 1.6 GHz
RAM: 1GB (up to 3 GB) DDR2-667
Storage: 160GB 5400rpm SATA
Display: 12.1" (1280x800)
Graphics: Intel GMA 950
Wi-Fi: 802.11b/g
Dimensions: 11.5 x 9.0 x 1.4 (inches)
Weight: 
Operating system: MS Windows XP Home

2010
The IdeaPad netbooks released in 2010 were the S10-3, S10-3t, and S10-3s.

S10-3
The IdeaPad S10-3 netbook was praised for its full-size keyboard, design, light chassis, and low price. It was criticized for its navigation experience, touchpad, low capacity hard drive, and the lack of options for customization. Michael Prospero from LAPTOP Magazine indicated in his review that Lenovo had addressed some of the issues raised about the S10-2 netbook and praised the keyboard and the design. He also indicated that the storage capacity was not on par with competitor offerings and that the touchpad could have been improved.

S10-3t
The IdeaPad S10-3t was a netbook that was also a convertible tablet. The S10-3t netbook was among the first computers to use the 1.83 GHz Intel Atom N470 processor. The software BumpTop was preloaded and offered a desk-like view of the desktop in 3D for ease of use.

S10-3s
The IdeaPad S10-3s was roughly an inch narrower than the S10-2, with a form factor of 10.6 x 6.6 x 1.4 inches. The netbook was also slightly lighter than similar netbooks and weighed 2.6 lbs. The netbook offered the following specifications:

Processor:  Intel Atom N450 1.66 GHz
RAM: 1GB DDR2
Graphics: Intel GMA 3150
Storage: 160GB 5400RPM SATA
Display: 10.1" (maximum resolution of 1024x600)

2011
The IdeaPad S Series netbooks released in 2011 were the S205 and the S215.

S205
The S205 had an AMD Fusion E350 dual core processor, 11.6" widescreen display with a 16:9 aspect ratio, and ATI Mobility Radeon 6310M graphics. The specifications of the S205 are as follows:
Processor: Up to 1.60 GHz AMD Dual-Core E-350
RAM: Up to 4GB DDR3 1066 MHz
Graphics: Up to AMD Radeon HD 6310M (512 MB graphics memory)
Dimensions (mm): 290 x 18~26.3 x 193
Weight: starting at 1.35 kg

S215 
The Lenovo IdeaPad S215 contained 500 GB, 5,400 RPM traditional HDD and 8 GB of solid-state storage.

2012

S300
Detailed specifications of the netbooks are as follows:
Processor: several (ie: Celeron 887)
RAM: 4GB 
Storage: SATA 500GB HDD
Display: 14"
Graphics: Intel GMA 950
Operating system: MS Windows 7

References

External links 
 IdeaPad S Series on Lenovo

S